The Flying Fish was a California clipper ship of the extreme type launched in 1851.  She was wrecked in 1858 while coming out of the Chinese port city of Fuzhou with a cargo of tea leaves.

References

California clippers